"Nobody Else" is a song by New Zealand musician brothers Tex Pistol (Ian Morris) and Rikki Morris. It was the follow-up single to Tex Pistol's cover of Wayne Fontana's "The Game of Love", which reached number one in New Zealand in 1987. "Nobody Else", an original song, also charted at number one.

Background 
After Tex Pistol had a number-one single in 1987 with "The Game of Love", Pagan Records head Trevor Reekie convinced Ian Morris to release "Nobody Else" as the follow-up single. It was a romantic ballad written and sung by Morris' younger brother Rikki. The song peaked at number one and charted for 16 weeks, twice as long as "The Game of Love".

Awards 
At the 1988 New Zealand Music Awards, "Nobody Else" was nominated for Single of the Year, with Ian Morris also nominated for Producer of the Year for the same song while Rikki Morris won Songwriter of the Year.

Track listing 
7-inch single
A. "Nobody Else"
B. "Wilf"

Charts

Weekly charts

Year-end charts

References 

1988 singles
1988 songs
New Zealand songs
Number-one singles in New Zealand